Tsar is an American rock band from Los Angeles, California, United States, with Jeff Whalen on lead vocals and guitar, Daniel Kern on vocals and guitar, Jeff Solomon on bass, and Steve Coulter on drums. They have released two major-label studio albums, two EPs, and a self-released demos collection. Citing their primary influences as Guns N' Roses and the Monkees, Tsar's music is a hybrid of glam rock, power pop, garage rock, punk rock, arena rock, and bubblegum music.

Career
Tsar formed in 1998. After a monthlong residency at Silver Lake's Spaceland club, they released their self-titled debut on Hollywood Records (2000), produced by Rob Cavallo (Green Day, Goo Goo Dolls) and mixed by Chris Lord-Alge (U2, Bruce Springsteen, Madonna). The album garnered critical acclaim but was commercially disappointing. AllMusic describes the album and its fate thus: "Tsar is a bit of a glam pop/hard rock hidden treasure that still sounds fresh and thrilling years later. Loaded with hooks, humor, and innocent charm, and coming across like the starry-eyed child of Cheap Trick and Sweet  . . . [t]he album was an exciting, hook-filled modern power pop record that nobody bought, despite (or perhaps because of) the band's subsequent opening slot on a Duran Duran tour."

Director James Gunn used the album's opening track, "Calling All Destroyers," to score the animated opening sequence of his 2010 action film Super. 

The band won "Local Album of the Year" and "Local Band of the Year" at the L.A. New Times Music Awards. Rock critic Bob Mehr wrote, "Every song glistens and glimmers with gargantuan hooks and stadium-size riffs . . . With this irresistibly catchy debut—and an onstage presence to match—Tsar is my nominee as the band best equipped to save rock 'n' roll from its postmillennial doldrums."

The band performed on the Late Late Show with Craig Kilborn, The Late Late Show with Craig Ferguson, and Pajama Party. The band's music has also appeared in the TV shows Veronica Mars, Freakylinks, NCIS, Party Down, and the feature film In the Land of Women. The songs "Ordinary Gurl" and "The Girl Who Wouldn't Die" were also featured prominently in the movie American Psycho 2.

Tsar has toured with the New York Dolls, Social Distortion, Eve 6, the Marvelous 3, Duran Duran, Juliette and the Licks, and Nerfherder.

Tsar recorded their followup, Band-Girls-Money, in 2003 with producer David Katznelson (founder of Birdman Records). After leaving Hollywood Records, Tsar released the album on TVT Records in 2005. The title song was included in the soundtrack for the racing games Burnout Revenge and its PSP and DS spin-off Burnout Legends. The band's lineup shifted, with Chuck Byler replacing Steve Coulter on drums and Derrick Forget replacing Jeff Solomon on bass. The band performed in a TV ad for Nestle Crunch Bar and Napster and filmed two videos: "The Love Explosion" and "Band-Girls-Money." The band also appeared on the cover of L.A. Weekly.

In late January 2010, Tsar's original lineup (Whalen/Kern/Solomon/Coulter) reunited. They released The Dark Stuff EP on Aderra Records (US) and LoJinx Records (UK/Europe) and shot a video for "Police Station." In 2011 Tsar self-released The Drugboy Tapes, a collection of early demos and live performances from 1998. A split 7-inch featuring the Olsen Twins song "Pool Party" was released by Aderra Records in March 2012.

Albums

Tsar - 2000
 Calling All Destroyers
 I Don't Wanna Break-Up
 Silver Shifter
 Kathy Fong Is The Bomb
 The Teen Wizards
 MONoSTEReo
 Afradio, Pt. One & Pt. Two
 Ordinary Gurl
 Disappear
 The Girl Who Wouldn't Die

King of the School EP - 2001
 King of the School (demo)
 Larger Than Life
 Silver Shifter (remix)
 You and Jim Will Hit It Off
 Songwriter! (live)
 Afraidio Pt. Two, Pt. Three, and Pt. Four (demo)
 Smart Boys (demo)

Band-Girls-Money - 2005
 Band-Girls-Money
 Wanna Get Dead
 The Love Explosion
 Superdeformed
 Straight
 Wrong
 Everybody's Fault But Mine
 Conqueror Worm
 Startime
 You Can't Always Want What You Get

The Drugboy Tapes (Demos 98) - 2011
 Afradio
 The Girl Who Wouldn't Die
 Ordinary Gurl
 Kathy Fong Is The Bomb
 Sun Of Light
 The Glower
 I Don't Wanna Break-Up
 Silver Shifter
 Calling All Destroyers (Live on KXLU)
 Monostereo (Live on KXLU)

Split 7-Inch - 2012
 Janitor by Suburban Lawns (Killola)
 Pool Party by The Olsen Twins (TSAR)

The Dark Stuff - EP - 2012
 Punctual Alcoholic
 Police Station
 Little Women
 White Lipstick
 Something Bad Happened to Me

References

External links
 Phoenix New Times, Tsar Power (2000) 
 MTV 
 Los Angeles Times, Tsar, with a Hint of Glam (2000)
 L.A. Weekly, Tsar, Reborn 
 Powerpopaholic, Jeff Whalen Interview
 Classic Albums Revisited, The Jeff Whalen Interview

Pop punk groups from California
Lojinx artists
Musical groups from Los Angeles
TVT Records artists